Romuald Twardowski (born 17 June 1930 in Wilno / Vilnius) is a Polish composer.

During years of occupation (or World War II), he studied the violin; after the war, he began learning to play the piano and organ. From 1946-1950, he played the organ for several Vilnius churches. From 1952 to 1957, he studied music composition in the conservatory of Vilnius. Afterwards, he moves to Warsaw and continues his studies at the Warsaw Academy of Music from 1957 to 1960, studying under Bolesław Woytowicz. In 1963 and 1966 he studied Gregorian chant and medieval polyphony in Nadia Boulanger's class in Paris. Since 1971 Twardowski has been a professor at the Fryderyk Chopin University of Music.

The 1960s and 1970s were the most fruitful period for the composer. 
Apart from operas:  
 "Cyrano de Bergerac" (1962)
 "Tragedy or the Story of John and Herod"(1965)
 "Lord Jim" (1973)
Composed ballets:
 "Naked Prince" (1960)
 "Wizard's Sculptures"(1963)

In the 1980s, he composed operas Maria Stuart and History of St. Catherine which were also performed abroad. Twardowski composed about 200 choral works, compositions for piano and orchestra. Recently his works are still widely performed in Poland and abroad – mainly in Eastern Europe and in United States where e.g. his Trio for violin has been very successful.

He is a laureate of many prizes and distinctions. Just to name few: 
 1st prize of Polish Young Composers competition,
 two Grand Prix in Monaco,
 1st Prize of Prague Spring International Music Festival,
 2nd place of UNESCO International Composers' Tribune in Paris,
 prize of AGEC (1994),
 2006 he received Paderewski Award (USA).

Twardowski is the jury member of many choir competitions.

Major compositions
list:
"Oberek"[version I] for violin and piano (1955)
"Oberek"[version II] for string orchestra (1955)
"Suite in the Old Style" for orchestra (1957)
"Seven Folk Songs" for voice and piano (1957)
"Small Sonata" for piano (1958)
"Small Symphony" for piano, strings and percussion (1959)
"Song of the White House" cantata for mixed choir, 2 pianos and percussion (1959)
"Songs of Spring" [version I] for female or boys choir (1959)
"Songs of Spring"[version II] for male choir (1959)
"Maple-tree Songs" for mixed choir (1960)
"Nocturnes" for mixed choir (1960)
"Lullabies" for mixed choir (1960)
"The Naked Prince", ballet-pantomime (1960)
"Warmia Suite" for mixed choir (1960)
"A Warmia Lullaby" for voice and piano (1960)
"Carmina de mortuis" for mixed choir (1961)
"Antifone"for three groups of orchestra (1961)
"Bucolics" for mixed choir (1962)
"Cantus antiqui" for soprano, harpsichord, piano and percussion (1962)
"Cyrano de Bergerac", romantic opera (1962)
"Nomopedia Cinque movimenti" for orchestra (1962)
"Psalmus 149" for mixed choir (1962)
"Small Suite" for violin and piano (1962)
"April Songs" for mixed choir (1963)
"Sorcerer's Sculptures (Sculptures by Master Piotr)", ballet-pantomime (1963)
"Miniatures" for mixed choir (1964)
"Ode 64" for orchestra (1964)
"Parabolas", pantomime (1964)
"Two Blackman Songs" for mixed choir (1965)
"Tragedy or the Story of John and Herod", morality opera (1965)
"Sonetti di Petrarca" for tenor solo and two choruses a cappella (1965)
"Tre studi secondo Giotto" for chamber orchestra (1966)
"Impressioni fiorentini" for four choirs instrumental (1967)
"Capricci" for piano (1967)
"Little Orthodox Liturgy" for vocal ensemble and 3 instrumental groups (1968)
"Ode to Youth" for reciting voice, mixed choir and orchestra (1969)
"The Fall of Father Suryn", radio musical drama (1969)
"Lord Jim", musical drama (1970–73)
"Three Farewell Sonnets"[version I] for bass-baritone and chamber orchestra (1971)
"Three Farewell Sonnets"[version II] for bass-baritone and piano (1971)
"Two Playful Songs"[version I] for mixed choir (1972)
"Two Playful Songs"[version II] for female or boys choir (1972)
"Prelude, toccata and choral" for symphony orchestra (1973)
"Triptych of the St Mary's Church" for string orchestra (1973)
"Preludio e toccata" for mxed choir (1974)
"A Study in A" for orchestra (1974)
"Improvvisazione e toccata" for two pianos (1974)
"Two Landscapes" for symphony orchestra (1975)
"Sea Impressions" for mixed choir (1975)
"Polish Landscape"[version I] for bass-baritone and symphony orchestra (1975)
"Polish Landscape"[version II] for bass-baritone and piano (1975)
"Laudate Dominum", a dialogue for 2 mixed choirs (1976)
"Sequentiae de ss. Patronis Polonis" for baritone, choir and instrumental ensemble (1977)
"My Sword is My Hand", three poems for solo tenor and mixed choir (1977)
"Maria Stuart", musical drama (1978)
"Capriccio in blue" for violin and orchestra (or piano) (1979)
"Lamentationes" for mixed choir (1979)
"Face of the Sea", 5 songs for bass-baritone and piano (1979)
"Preludio, recitativo ed aria con variazioni" for harpsichord (piano) (1979)
"Sonata breve" for harpsichord (piano) (1979)
"Village Concert" for mixed choir (1980)
"Musica concertante" for piano (1980)
"Small Concert" for piano and instrumental ensemble (1980)
"On Four Strings" for violin and piano (1980)
"Three Songs from Kurpie" for mixed choir (1980)
"The Story of St Catherine", musical morality (1981)
"Fantasia" for organs (1982)
"Polish Fantasia" for 2 violins (1982)
"Salve Regina" for female choir and organs (1982)
"Three Pieces" for organs (1982)
"Ave Maris Stella"[version I] for make choir and organs (or piano) (1982)
"Erotics" for voice and piano (1983)
"Joannes Rex", a cantata for baritone, mixed choir and orchestra (1983)
"Concert for piano and orchestra"(1984)
"Fun Fair" for piano (1984)
"Spanish Fantasia"[version I] for violin and orchestra (or piano) (1985)
"Spanish Fantasia"[version II] for cello and piano (1985)
"Little Triptych" for wind quintet (1986)
"Three Frescoes" for symphony orchestra (1986)
"Allegro rustico" for oboe and piano (1986)
"Symphonic Variations on the Theme of George Gershwin" for solo percussion and orchestra (1986)
"The Kitten and the Dragon", 7 songs for voice and piano (1986)
"Trio for violin, cello and piano"(1987)
"Old Polish Concert" for string orchestra (1987)
"Three Songs to the words of Stanisław Ryszard Dobrowolski" for baritone and piano (1987)
"Small Concert" for vocal orchestra (1988)
"Lithuanian Variations" for flute, oboe, clarinet, horn and bassoon (1988)
"Michael Angelo Sonnets" for baritone and piano (1988)
"Bell Symphonies" for piano (1988–91)
"Italian Album" for orchestra (1989)
"Old Polish Dance" for 3 guitars (1989)
"Espressioni" for violin and piano (1990)
"Alleluia" for mixed choir (1990)
"Chwalitie Imia Gospodina (Praise the Name of the Lord)"[version I] for mixed choir (1990)
"Three Sonnets to Don Quixote" for bass-baritone and piano (1990)
"By the Neris" for baritone and piano (1990)
"Niggunim", Hassidic melodies for violin and symphony orchestra (or piano) (1991)
"Tu es Petrus" for baritone, mixed choir and symphony orchestra (1991)
"Hosanna I" for mixed choir (1992)
"Pleiades" for violin and piano (1993)
"Teenage Trio" for violin, cello and piano (1993)
"St Mary's Songs" for soprano and small symphony orchestra (1993)
"Sonatina for Two Violins"(1993)
"Canticum Canticorum" for soprano, flute, clarinet and strings (1994)
"Concert for cello and orchestra"(1995)
"Wsjakoje dychanije (All Breath)" for mixed choir (1996)
"Invocation and capriccio" for 2 cellos (1996)
"Regina coeli" for mixed choir (1996)
"In the Green Grove", 5 miniatures for piano 4 hands (1996)
"Hosanna II" for mixed choir (1997)
"Concerto breve" for string orchestra (1998)
"To You Władyka" for mixed choir (1998)
"O gloriosa Domina" for mixed choir (1999)
"Hommage a J. S. Bach", cycle of pieces for piano (2000)
"Two Christmas Carols" for boys choir (2000)
"In Thy Kingdom" for mixed choir (2000)
"Praise My Soul" for mixed choir (2000)
"Intermezzo" for piano (2000)
"Introduction and Allegro" for violin and piano (2001)
"Missa "Regina caeli"" for mixed choir (2001)
"Capriccio" for violin and piano (2001)
"O salutaris" for mixed choir (2001)
"Jubilate Deo" for mixed choir (2001)
"Ave Maris Stella"[version II] for male choir (2002)
"Pastorals and Humoresque" for oboe and piano (2002)
"Praise the Name of the Lord"[version II] for male choir (2002)
"Musica festiva" for organs (2002)
"In a Chinese Garden" for percussion ensemble (2002)
"Toccata and choral" for organs (2002)
"Jesus, I Trust in Thee. The Mystery of God's Mercy" for soprano, baritone, 2 reciting voices, mixed choir and orchestra (2002)
"Im ZOO" for violin and piano (2002)
"The Elegant Hedgehog and the Hoopoe" for voice and piano (2002)
"Three Sketches" for violin, viola and cello (2003)
"Serenade" for string orchestra (2003-2004)
"Three intermezzos" for organs (2004)
"Summer with Dad" for voice and piano (2004)
"Tango" for cello and piano (2004)
"Meditation" for cello and piano (2004)
"Campane IV" from the "Bell Symphonies" cycle for piano (2004)
"The White Eagle" for voice and piano (2004)
"Pater noster" for mixed choir (2005)
"The Paschal Triptych" for organs (2005)
"Trio for violin, cello and piano no. 2"(2005)
"Our Father" for mixed choir (2005)
"Concert for violin and string orchestra"(2006)
"Myscerium crucis" for a cappella mixed choir (2006)
"Popule meus" for mixed choir (2006)

Selected discography
 2000 : Twardowski - Rogowski - Choral Orthodox Works - Acte Préalable AP0058 
 2000 : Romuald Twardowski - Solo, Chamber and Vocal Works - Acte Préalable AP0059 
 2001 : Gaude Mater Festival - 3 - Polish Mass - Acte Préalable AP0098 
 2001 : Musica Polonica Nova - Warsaw Composers 1 - Acte Préalable AP0100  
 2002 - Romuald Twardowski - Complete Works for Violin and Piano - Acte Préalable AP0089 
 2003 : Romuald Twardowski - Missa Regina caeli - Acte Préalable AP0090 
 2004 : Romuald Twardowski - Complete piano works - Acte Préalable AP0066 
 2004 : Musica Polonica Nova - Warsaw Composers 2 - Acte Préalable AP0108  
 2004 : Romuald Twardowski - Concertos - Acte Préalable AP0110  
 2005 : Romuald Twardowski - Works for string orchestra - Acte Préalable AP0120  
 2006 : Romuald Twardowski - Chamber Music: Acte Préalable AP0140  
 2008 : Romuald Twardowski - Complete organ works - Acte Préalable AP0175  
 2008 : Romuald Twardowski - Concertos - Acte Préalable AP0179  
 2008 : Romuald Twardowski - Liturgy of St. John Chrysostom - Acte Préalable AP0193  
 2009 : Romuald Twardowski - Exegi monumentum - Acte Préalable AP0231  
 2011 : UNIVERSITAS CANTAT 1998-2011 - Acte Préalable AP0295-99  
 2017 : Luctus (Żałość) - Acte Préalable AP0378  
 2018 : Romuald Twardowski - In the Night's Stillness - Acte Préalable AP0440

References

"Romuald Twardowski kompozytor w zwierciadle krytyki"  (Warsaw 2009)

1930 births
Living people
Lithuanian Academy of Music and Theatre alumni
Polish composers
Polish opera composers
Academic staff of the Chopin University of Music
Musicians from Vilnius
People from Wilno Voivodeship (1926–1939)
Polish male classical composers